Dicky Thompson (born June 13, 1957) is an American professional golfer who played on the PGA Tour and the Nationwide Tour.

Thompson joined the Nationwide Tour in 1990. He won the Ben Hogan Baton Rouge Open and the Ben Hogan Elizabethtown Open en route to an 8th-place finish on the money list which earned him his PGA Tour card for 1991. He did not perform well enough on his rookie year on Tour to retain his card but got his Tour card for 1992 through qualifying school. After another poor year on the PGA Tour, he took a hiatus until earning his PGA Tour card for 1995 through qualifying school. He did not do well enough to retain his card but did record his best finish on the PGA Tour of his career, finishing in a tie for fourth at the Deposit Guaranty Golf Classic. He took another hiatus from Tour and rejoined the Nationwide Tour in 1999 where he recorded five top-10 finishes. He played on the Nationwide Tour again in 2000, his last season on Tour.

Thompson played on the NGA Hooters Tour in 1989, 1994 and from 1996 to 1999. He won six tournaments during that time.

Professional wins (10)

Ben Hogan Tour wins (2)

Ben Hogan Tour playoff record (1–0)

Other wins (8)
1998 Georgia Open
1999 Georgia Open
6 wins on the NGA Hooters Tour

Results in major championships

CUT = missed the half-way cut
Note: Thompson never played in the Masters Tournament or the PGA Championship.

See also
1990 PGA Tour Qualifying School graduates
1991 PGA Tour Qualifying School graduates
1994 PGA Tour Qualifying School graduates

External links

American male golfers
Georgia Bulldogs men's golfers
PGA Tour golfers
Golfers from Atlanta
1957 births
Living people